My Friend's Dulhania  is a 2017 Hindi feature film starring Mudasir Zafar, Shaina Baweja, Saurabbh Roy, Mayur Mehta, Pooja Rathi, Atique Mujawar and Farheen Siddique.

Plot
This movie is the story of a couple,  
Aryan and Mahira, who got separated because of career and higher studies. Aryan had faith in his love but Mahira left him and cut all her connections with him. This incident breaks his heart.
After 2 years he receives a phone call from his college friends, Harsh and Sneha to invite him to the marriage ceremony of their friend Sajad. After reaching the marriage venue, Bhaderwah, state of Jammu and Kashmir, when everyone was insisting Sajad to show the bride's picture, Aryan got speechless as it was the picture of Mahira.
Will the two get together again or not?

Cast 
 Mudasir Zafar as Aryan
 Shaina Baweja as Maahira
 Mayur Mehta as Harsh                                           
 Saurabbh Roy as Sajjad
 Pooja Rathi as Sneha
 Atique Mujawar as Visphoth khan
 Farheen Siddique as Tamanna
 Harsh soni as Various character 
 Aakash sharma as Lover boy

References

External links 
 
 

2017 films